The 1980 NCAA Division II Lacrosse Championship was the seventh annual single-elimination tournament to determine the national champions of NCAA Division II men's college lacrosse in the United States.

This was the first tournament exclusively for Division II men's programs following the introduction of a separate Division III men's championship. With the exodus of programs, the tournament field decreased from twelve to just two. 

The final, and only match of the tournament, was played at UMBC Stadium at the University of Maryland, Baltimore County in Catonsville, Maryland. 

In a rematch of the previous year's final, hosts UMBC defeated defending champions Adelphi, 23–14, to win their first national title. The Retrievers (11–3) were coached by Dick Watts.

Bracket

See also
NCAA Division I Men's Lacrosse Championship
NCAA Division III Men's Lacrosse Championship – introduced in 1980
NCAA Division II Women's Lacrosse Championship – introduced in 2001

References

NCAA Division II Men's Lacrosse Championship
NCAA Division II Men's Lacrosse Championship
NCAA Division II Men's Lacrosse